The yellowfin seabream, Acanthopagrus latus (also known as yellow sea bream or datina), is a porgy of the family Sparidae.

References

latus
Fish described in 1782
Taxa named by Martinus Houttuyn